The World Snooker Championship is the longest-running and most prestigious tournament in professional snooker. It is also the richest, with total prize money in 2022 of £2,395,000, including £500,000 for the winner. First held in 1927, it is now one of the three tournaments (together with the UK Championship and the invitational Masters) that make up snooker's Triple Crown Series. The reigning world champion is Ronnie O'Sullivan.

Joe Davis dominated the tournament over its first two decades, winning the first 15 world championships before he retired undefeated after his final victory in 1946.  The distinctive World Championship trophy, topped by a Greek shepherdess figurine, was acquired by Davis in 1926 for £19 and continues in use to this day. No tournaments were held between 1941 and 1945 due to World War II, or between 1952 and 1963 due to a dispute between the Professional Billiards Players' Association (PBPA) and the Billiards Association and Control Council (BACC). The PBPA held an unofficial alternative, the World Professional Match-play Championship, between 1952 and 1957. The official championship was revived on a challenge basis in 1964.

The World Snooker Championship reverted to a knockout tournament format in 1969, beginning what is now known as snooker's modern era. It has taken place annually since then, with every championship since 1977 staged at the Crucible Theatre in Sheffield. Under a format that has remained largely unchanged since 1982, 32 players reach the Crucible each year; the top 16 players in the world rankings qualify automatically, while another 16 players win places through a qualification tournament. Only three qualifiers have ever won the tournament: Alex Higgins in 1972, Terry Griffiths in 1979, and Shaun Murphy in 2005.

Stephen Hendry and Ronnie O'Sullivan hold the joint record of seven world titles each in the modern era. Both Ray Reardon and Steve Davis have won six titles; John Higgins and Mark Selby four; John Spencer and Mark Williams three; and Alex Higgins two. The youngest champion in the tournament's history is Hendry, who won his first title in 1990, aged 21 years and 106 days. O'Sullivan became the oldest champion in 2022, winning his seventh title aged 46 years and 148 days. Steve Davis and O'Sullivan jointly hold the record for the most Crucible appearances, with 30 each, although O'Sullivan has made the most consecutive appearances, having taken part in the tournament every year between 1993 and 2022. Twelve maximum breaks have been made in the history of the tournament, Cliff Thorburn having achieved the first in 1983. A record 109 century breaks were made at the Crucible in 2022.

History

Professional Snooker Championship (1927–1934)

The first championship was held in 1927, where it was known as the Professional Snooker Championship. It was the first professional snooker tournament although the English Amateur Championship has been contested since 1916. Ten professionals entered including most of the leading English billiards players. Matches were over 15 frames with the semi-finals over twenty-three frames and final over 31 . The first match played was between Melbourne Inman and Tom Newman at Thurston's Hall, Leicester Square in London. The snooker was played as an added extra to the main event, a billiards match played over two weeks. The match started on Monday 29 November 1926 and one frame of snooker was played at the end of each session. The final between Joe Davis and Tom Dennis was played over four days in early May at Camkin's Hall in Birmingham. Davis won the first seven frames, and took a winning 16–7 lead on the third day, eventually winning 20–11. The highest break of the tournament was sixty, made by Albert Cope in his semi-final match against Davis, in a dead frame after Davis had won the match.

The 1928 Championship was played on a challenge basis, with the other six entries playing-off for the right to challenge Davis in the final. Fred Lawrence progressed to the final, but lost 13–16. The challenge system was dropped in the 1929 event. Davis met Dennis in the final, played in Dennis's home town of Nottingham. Davis made a new record break of 61, on the way to a 19–14 victory. The same pair met in the 1930 final, played for the first time at Thurston's Hall in London, with Davis winning 25–12, with a day to spare and made a new record break of 79. With little prospect of success and little prospect of financial gain, there were only two entries for the 1931 championship. Davis and Tom Dennis met for the fourth time, the event being played in Nottingham. Dennis led 19–16 at one stage, but Davis won nine of the next eleven frames to take the Championship 25–21.

There were three entries for the 1932 tournament. Clark McConachy met Davis in the final, played at Thurston's Hall. Davis took the title after a 30–19 win, and set a new record with a break of 99, missing out on his century after he snookered himself. There were five entries in 1933, with debutant Willie Smith meeting Davis in the final, but lost 18–25. There were just two entries in 1934, Davis being opposed by Tom Newman, six times World Billiards Champion. The match was held partly in Nottingham before finishing in Kettering, with Davis winning 25–22.

Thurston's Hall era (1935–1940)

The 1935 Championship introduced some significant changes. It was the first to incorporate "world" in its name, being called the World's Professional Snooker Championship. There was also a change in the organisation of the event with the matches being played consecutively at the same venue, Thurston's Hall in London. In the period from 1935 to 1940, nearly all World Championship matches were played there and with good attendances the professionals could make some money from their share of the entrance charges. Because of the importance of gate receipts, all frames were played out, even if a player had already won the match.

There were five entries in 1935 Championship. Joe Davis beat Willie Smith 28–21 in the final. Davis recorded the first century break in the history of the championship, 110 in his semi-final match against Tom Newman. The break was made in a dead frame but was still regarded as a championship record. The success of the 1935 championship resulted in a record 13 entries in 1936. Joe Davis and Horace Lindrum met in the final, with Davis having won one of his prior matches 29–2 after taking a winning 16–0 lead; whilst Lindrum had won his semi-final by the same score, 29–2, In the final, Lindrum led 26–24 at the start of the final day and then won the first frame on the last day. However Davis won the last ten frames in a row to win 34–27.

Qualifying was introduced for the first time in 1937. As the event had nine entries, two players were chosen to play a qualification match. The two were Fred Davis, Joe's younger brother and Bill Withers. Withers won the match 17–14, a defeat that Fred put down to ignoring his worsening eyesight. Lindrum played Joe Davis in the final, and led 17–13 at the half-way stage, but Davis recovered to win the match 32–29. Davis made a break of 103 in the final, the first championship century in live play.

Lindrum chose not to enter the 1938 event, which Davis also won, beating Sidney Smith in the final. The following year, Davis met Smith again in the final, and took a winning 37–25 lead on the final day. The 1940 Championship featured the Davis brothers meeting in the final. Joe led 15–10 but then Fred won eleven frames in succession to lead 21–15. On the final day Joe made a 101 break to take a winning 37–35 lead. The spectators cheered for nearly a minute when Joe made his century. In October 1940, during The Blitz, Thurston's Hall was destroyed by a parachute mine which demolished the south-western corner of Leicester Square. No tournaments were played during the remainder of World War II.

Post-war era (1946–1952)

The championship resumed in 1946 where Joe Davis again met Lindrum in the final. The Royal Horticultural Hall in London was converted to a snooker venue, seating 1,250 for the championships. The match was extended from one week to two, allowing up to 30,000 spectators to be accommodated with prices ranging from 5s to £3. Davis maintained a small lead throughout and won, early on the final day, leading 73–62. Davis made six centuries in the final, setting new championship records of 133 and 136. The event proved a financial success for the players, with Davis receiving £1,800 and Lindrum £550.

In October 1946, Joe Davis announced that he would no longer play in the World Championship, having never lost a match in the championship from its inception in 1927. He did not, in any other sense, retire from snooker, continuing to play in other tournaments and exhibition matches for many years. The finalists for the 1947 championship, Fred Davis and Walter Donaldson, agreed to delay the final until the autumn so that it could be played at the rebuilt Thurston's Hall. Donaldson got off to a good start, leading 44–28 after the first week and eventually took a winning 73–49 lead early on the 11th day. The pair met again in the 1948 final, Fred Davis and Walter Donaldson again reached the final, with Davis winning 73–49. They also contested the 1949 final, and although Donaldson led 39–33 after the first week, Davis pulled ahead on the second week and eventually took a winning 73–58 lead. After three finals at Leicester Square Hall the 1950 final moved to Blackpool Tower Circus. Fred Davis and Donaldson met in the final for the next two years, with Donaldson winning in 1950, 49–42, and Davis in 1951.

Following a dispute between the Professional Billiards Players' Association (PBPA) and the Billiards Association and Control Council (BACC), members of the PBPA boycotted the 1952 championship. The BACC thought the championship should be primarily a matter of honour, and financial considerations should come second. As a consequence of the boycott there were only two entries, Lindrum and McConachy. McConachy had played in the recent News of the World Tournament but had performed badly, losing all eight of his matches. Although Lindrum did not play in the News of the World Tournament, he had been receiving more generous starts in recent handicap tournaments and had even withdrawn from the 1950 Sporting Record Masters' Snooker Tournament in 1950, complaining about his overly generous handicap. Lindrum won the championship, reaching a winning 73–37 position early on the tenth day.

World Professional Match-play Championship (1952–1957)

Having boycotted the official championship, the PBPA established their own championship called the PBPA Snooker Championship which attracted ten entries. Fred Davis and Donaldson were given byes to the semi-final stage, and met again in the final, held at the Blackpool Tower Circus, as Davis won 38–35. A second such championship was played the following year, referred to as the 1953 World Professional Match-play Championship, with the same finalists. Played at Leicester Square Hall, it was tied at 33–33 at the start of the final session but Davis won 37–34. The pair met in the 1954 final, held in Manchester, their eighth successive final. It was the most one-sided of the eight finals, Davis taking a winning 36–15 lead early on the fifth day.

Fred Davis met John Pulman in the 1955 final at Blackpool Tower Circus, with Davis winning 38–35. Davis defeated Pulman again in the 1956 final, but did not enter the 1957 championship. Pulman defeated Jackie Rea in the final to win his first world title.

Challenge matches (1964–1968)

With the approval of the BACC, the championship was revived on a challenge basis in 1964. The first contest was played in Burroughes Hall, London in April 1964 between Pulman and Davis, with Pulman retaining the championship after winning 19–16. Pulman won two further challenge matches played at Burroughes Hall, beating Rex Williams in October 1964, and Davis again in March 1965. In late 1965 Pulman and Rex Williams played a long series of short matches in South Africa. Pulman won twenty-five of the forty-seven matches to retain the title. Williams set a new championship record with a break of 142 in the twenty-fourth match. After this series of matches Pulman played the South African Fred Van Rensburg, winning 39 frames to 12. Davis and Pulman played again for the championship in April 1966. Pulman won four of the seven matches to retain the title. Australian Eddie Charlton challenged Pulman to a 73 frame match in Bolton, played in March 1968. Pulman led 19–17 at the half-way stage, and pulled ahead and won the match 37–28.

Knockout tournaments (1969–1976)

For 1969, the championship reverted to being run as a knockout tournament. This is regarded as the beginning of the modern era for snooker. Eight professionals entered, four from the 1950s and four new professionals. The first match, played in late 1968, saw the end of John Pulman's reign as champion, beaten by one of the new professionals, John Spencer. Spencer led 24–18 after the final afternoon session and clinched the match by winning the first frame in the evening with a ninety-seven break. Spencer and another of the new professionals, Gary Owen, met in the final at the Victoria Halls in London. Spencer won the seventy-three frame final 37–24. Spencer lost to Ray Reardon at the semi-final stage of the 1970 Championship. Reardon went on to win the final against John Pulman to win his first title.

The next world championship was held in Australia in late 1970. For the only time there was a group stage with nine players, with the top four moving on to a knock-out stage. Ray Reardon and John Spencer met in one semi-final with Spencer winning easily. The other semi-final was between two Australians, Warren Simpson and Eddie Charlton. Simpson caused a major upset by beating Charlton. In the final in Sydney, Spencer led throughout and won the six-day final 37–29. 1972 saw the emergence of Alex Higgins. Winning his two qualifying matches, he beat John Pulman, Rex Williams and then Spencer in the final to win the title at his first attempt. At , Higgins was the youngest world champion. Previously only Joe Davis had won the title while under the age of 30, being  when he won in 1927.

The 1973 Championship marked a change in format, with the tournament played over two weeks at a single venue rather than over an extended period. Sixteen played in the first round, the eight winners playing eight seeded players in the second round. In the semi-finals, defending champion Alex Higgins lost 9–23 to Eddie Charlton while Ray Reardon beat John Spencer 23–22. In the five-day final Charlton led 7–0 after the opening session but Reardon led 17–13 after two days. The match continued to be close but Reardon pulled ahead on the final day to win 38–32, for his second title. The 1974 Championship followed a similar format but with somewhat shorter matches and event reduced to ten days. Sixty-year-old Fred Davis beat Alex Higgins in the quarter-finals before losing to Ray Reardon. Reardon met Graham Miles in the three-day final. Reardon led 17–11 after two days and won comfortably 22–12.

The 1975 Championship was held in Australia. Twenty-seven players competed including eight from Australia, sixteen from the United Kingdom, two from Canada and one from South Africa. Ray Reardon beat John Spencer and Alex Higgins to reach the final where he met Eddie Charlton. The final was held near Melbourne but matches were held in many locations, the semi-finals having been held in Canberra and Brisbane. In the final, Reardon won ten of the twelve frames on the second day to lead 16–8 but Charlton won the first nine frames on the third day to lead. Reardon then led 23–21 before Charlton won eight frames in a row to lead 29–23, needing just two of the last nine frames to win. However Reardon then won seven frames in a row to lead again and, although Charlton levelled the match at 30–30, Reardon won the deciding frame.

The 1976 World Snooker Championship was held at two venues; half the draw was held in Middlesbrough and half in Manchester, which also hosted the final. Alex Higgins won three close matches to reach the final, where he met Ray Reardon. Reardon led 24–15 at the start of the last day and, winning three of the first four frames, took the title 27–16, his fourth successive title. There were a number of problems during the tournament including the standard of the tables. This was the first year the championship was sponsored under the cigarette brand Embassy.

Crucible era starts (1977–1980)

In 1977, the championship moved to its new home at the Crucible Theatre in Sheffield, where it has remained ever since. The 1977 championship featured sixteen competitors: eight seeded players and eight qualifiers. John Spencer beat defending champion Ray Reardon 13–6 in the quarter-finals, and met Canadian Cliff Thorburn in the final. The two players were closely matched throughout, the score being tied at 9–9 after the first day and 18–18 after the second. Spencer led 22–20 after the first session on the final day, and pulled ahead to win 25–21 in the final session of the match. 

Defending champion John Spencer lost to Perrie Mans in the first round of the 1978 championship. The 1977 runner-up Cliff Thorburn was defeated 12–13 in his quarter-final match against Eddie Charlton, who won the last five frames. However, Charlton then lost to Ray Reardon in the semi-finals; he was ahead 12–9 after the first three sessions of the match, but Reardon won all seven frames of the fourth session to win 18–14. Mans met sixty-four-year-old Fred Davis in the other semi-final, defeating him 18–16. Reardon won the final 25–18 to claim his sixth world title. He became the oldest World Champion, aged . The first seven World Snooker Champions all won a championship when in their forties; the last of these was Reardon. It would be another forty years before a quadragenarian won the title again, as Mark Williams won the 2018 championship aged forty-three.

The 1979 championship was won by Terry Griffiths who had only turned professional seven months prior to the tournament, and needed to win two qualifying matches to reach the Crucible. Griffiths was trailing 16–17 against Eddie Charlton in the semi-final, before eventually winning the match 19–17 at 1.40 am. He then beat Dennis Taylor 24–16 in the final, winning the record first prize of £10,000. Canadian Bill Werbeniuk made a break of 142 in his quarter-final match against John Virgo, equalling the championship record set by Rex Williams in South Africa in 1965.

In the 1980 championship, the number of participants was extended to twenty-four players. Those seeded from nine to sixteen each met a qualifier in the first round, the winner meeting one of the top eight seeds in the second round. Several changes were made to accommodate the extra matches, including a reduction in the number of frames played in the final, to a maximum of thirty-five. Cliff Thorburn met Alex Higgins in the final. The match was level at 9–9 after the first day and again at 13–13 after the afternoon session on the second day. During the evening session, the score was tied once again at 16–16, before Thorburn made a 119 clearance in frame thirty-three and a break of fifty-one in frame thirty-four to win the championship.

Steve Davis years (1981–1989)

Despite being the number thirteen seed, Steve Davis was the favourite for the 1981 championship. He won a close match 10–8 against Jimmy White in the first round and defeated three past world champions to meet fourteenth seed Doug Mountjoy in the final. Davis won the first six frames but was only leading 10–8 at the end of the first day. He led 14–12 at the start of the final evening session and won the next four frames to win the match 18–12. At 23 years old, Davis was the second-youngest champion. Mountjoy set a new championship record with a highest break of 145 during his semi-final match against Ray Reardon.

The 1982 championship was extended to thirty-two players with sixteen seeded players and sixteen qualifiers. There was a surprise in the first round when Tony Knowles beat defending champion Steve Davis 10–1. In the semi-finals Jimmy White was ahead 15–14, and led 59–0 in the thirtieth frame, but missed an easy red with the rest. His opponent Alex Higgins then made a sixty-nine clearance and won the deciding frame and the match 16–15. Higgins met Ray Reardon in the final. The score was 15–15 before Higgins won three frames in a row to win the championship, finishing with a clearance of 135, denying Reardon the chance to win a seventh world title.

Cliff Thorburn made the first maximum break of the World Championship in 1983 during his second-round match against Terry Griffiths. The importance of this achievement at the time is demonstrated by the fact that play was stopped on the other table. This was the break that gave the World Championship one of its most iconic words of commentary, "oh, good luck mate" on the final black, courtesy of Jack Karnehm. Thorburn beat Griffiths in a final-frame decider, a match that finished at 03:51, the latest-ever finish for a match at the Crucible. Thorburn then also won his quarter-final and semi-final matches in the deciding frame; exhausted, and deflated by the news that his wife had suffered a miscarriage, he faced a one-sided final against Steve Davis who won 18–6. The 1984 final was between Steve Davis and Jimmy White (in his first final). Davis led 12–4 after the first day but White won seven of the eight frames on the final afternoon. Davis led 16–12 at the evening interval and, despite a comeback from White, Davis won 18–16.

In the 1985 final, also known as the black ball final, Dennis Taylor beat Steve Davis 18–17 on the final ball of the final frame, in one of the most closely contested matches of all time. It finished at 00:19 and, with an audience of 18.5 million, it remains the most-watched programme in the history of BBC2, and holds the record for a post-midnight audience for any channel in the United Kingdom. Davis met sixteenth seed Joe Johnson in the 1986 final. Johnson led 13–11 at the start of the evening session and won five of the first six frames to win 18–12. Johnson had trailed 9–12 in his quarter-final against Terry Griffiths but won the last four frames to win 13–12. Johnson and Davis met again in the 1987 final although, on this occasion, Davis was the winner by a score of 18–14.

Steve Davis and Terry Griffiths met in the 1988 final. The score was 8–8 after the first day but Davis pulled ahead on the final day and won 18–11. Davis made his seventh successive final in 1989, meeting John Parrott. Davis led 13–3 after the first day and won the first five frames on the second day to win the match 18–3. Davis won £105,000 for his 1989 victory, a new record.

Stephen Hendry dominates (1990–1999)

In 1990, Steve Davis failed to reach the final for the first time since 1982, losing in the semi-finals 14–16 to Jimmy White.

In 1991, Hendry, the number one seed, lost in the quarter-finals to Steve James. The final was between John Parrott and Jimmy White, Parrott winning 18–11.

In 1992, Jimmy White became the second player to make a maximum break in the world championship, during his 10–4 first round win over Tony Drago. Defending champion John Parrott beat Eddie Charlton 10–0, the first of only two whitewashes in the Crucible era (the second being by Shaun Murphy over Luo Honghao in 2019). Stephen Hendry met Jimmy White in the final. White led 14–8 but Hendry won ten frames in a row to win 18–14.

In 1993, James Wattana, from Thailand, became the first Asian player to reach the semi-finals, where he lost to Jimmy White. The final was one-sided, with Stephen Hendry beating White 18–5. Total prize money reached £1,000,000 for the first time.

In 1994, Jimmy White reached his sixth final, meeting Stephen Hendry for the fourth time in the final. Hendry led 5–1 but White won six frames in a row to lead 7–5. Thereafter the match was always close and eventually went to a final frame. White missed a black off the spot, after which Hendry made a break of fifty-eight to clinch the title. Fergal O'Brien made a century in his first frame at the Crucible, the only player ever to do so.

In 1995, Hendry and White met in the semi-finals, where Hendry won again, making a maximum break during the match. In the other semi-final Nigel Bond beat unseeded Andy Hicks. The final was initially close until Hendry won nine frames in a row to take the score from 5–5 to 14–5. Hendry eventually won 18–9. Hendry made a record twelve century breaks during the tournament.

In 1996, Peter Ebdon reached the final, beating Jimmy White, Steve Davis and Ronnie O'Sullivan on the way. He met Stephen Hendry in the final. Ebdon led 4–2 in the early stages but Hendry eventually won 18–12 to win his fifth successive title. There were forty-eight century breaks during the final stages, a new record.

In 1997, in the first round of the championship, Ronnie O'Sullivan made the fastest maximum break in snooker history, taking just five minutes and twenty seconds: this time would be later revised as five minutes and eight seconds. The final was between Stephen Hendry and Irishman Ken Doherty. Doherty led 15–7 before Hendry won five frames in a row. Doherty then won the next three frames to win 18–12, ending Hendry's winning run of twenty-nine consecutive matches.

In 1998, Stephen Hendry lost to Jimmy White in the first round of the championship. Doherty reached the final again meeting 22-year-old John Higgins. Higgins won 18–12, making five centuries in the final. In total there were fifty-nine centuries during the tournament of which Higgins made fourteen, both records.

In 1999, Stephen Hendry won his seventh and final world title, the most in the modern era until being equalled by Ronnie O'Sullivan in 2022. In the final he beat Mark Williams 18–11. In the semi-final between Hendry and O'Sullivan each player made four century breaks, the eight centuries being a record for a world championship match.

The class of '92 (2000–2013)

The period from 2000 to 2013 was dominated by three players, all born in 1975 and who all turned professional in 1992. Ronnie O'Sullivan won five times in this period, John Higgins three times and Mark Williams twice. Higgins had also won in 1998; Williams would win again in 2018 and O'Sullivan went on to win in 2020 and 2022.

In 2000 Stephen Hendry was beaten 10–7 in the first round by Crucible debutant Stuart Bingham. In his semi-final, Mark Williams trailed 11–15 to John Higgins but took six frames in a row to win 17–15. In the final, Williams met fellow Welshman Matthew Stevens. Stevens led 13–7 but Williams made another comeback to win 18–16, becoming the first left-handed champion.

Ronnie O'Sullivan won his first world championship in 2001, defeating John Higgins 18–14 in the final. O'Sullivan led 14–7 before Higgins won four frames in a row. O'Sullivan looked likely to win the title in the 31st frame as he led 17–13 and 69–6, however he missed a red in the middle pocket and Higgins won the frame with a break of 65. Higgins made a break of 45 in frame 32 but O'Sullivan made an 80 break to take the title.

Stephen Hendry beat Ronnie O'Sullivan 17–13 in the semi-final of the 2002 Championship, Hendry reaching his ninth final. Peter Ebdon beat Matthew Stevens 17–16 in the other semi-final. Stevens led 16–14 but Ebdon won the last three frames. The final went to the deciding frame where Ebdon made a break of 59 and clinched the title. There were a record sixty-eight centuries in the tournament, including a record sixteen by Stephen Hendry who made five centuries in the semi-final and a further four in the final.

Mark Williams won his second World title in 2003 by defeating Ken Doherty 18–16 in the final. Prize money peaked in 2003 with the winner receiving a record £270,000 and the thirty-two Crucible players getting at least £15,000. Ronnie O'Sullivan made the fifth maximum break in the World Championship, becoming the first player to score two 147s in the event.

Ronnie O'Sullivan won his second world title in 2004 by defeating Graeme Dott 18–8 in the final, despite Dott having led 5–0.

Shaun Murphy won the 2005 championship by defeating Matthew Stevens 18–16 in the final. Murphy was only the second qualifier to win the World Championship, after Terry Griffiths in 1979. Murphy won two qualifying matches and then five matches at the Crucible to take the title.

Graeme Dott beat Peter Ebdon 18–14 in the 2006 final. The match finished at 00:52 am, the latest finish of a World Snooker Championship final. This was the first Championship sponsored by a betting company after the banning of tobacco sponsorship. Dott won £200,000 for his victory with the thirty-two Crucible players getting at least £9,600, both significant reductions on the 2003 prize money. In the last round of the qualifying competition Robert Milkins had the first 147 break made during qualifying for the championship. Despite his maximum, Milkins lost to Mark Selby.

The 2007 Championship was won by John Higgins who beat qualifier Mark Selby 18–13 in the final. The match finished at 00:55 am, even later than the 2006 final and setting another record for the latest finish in the final. Shaun Murphy came back from 7–12 down to win his quarter-final match against Matthew Stevens, but lost in the deciding frame of his semi-final to Mark Selby.

The 2008 Championship was won by Ronnie O'Sullivan who beat Ali Carter 18–8 in the final. Both O'Sullivan and Carter had made maximum breaks earlier in the tournament, the first time there had been two 147 breaks in the same World Championship. It was O'Sullivan's third maximum in the Championship.

John Higgins won his third world title in 2009, beating Shaun Murphy 18–9. Michaela Tabb refereed the match, becoming the first woman to do so in a World Championship final. There were a record eighty-three century breaks in the Championship, well ahead of the previous highest of sixty-eight. Stephen Hendry won his 1000th  at the Crucible Theatre, the first player to do so. The championship included the second longest ever frame at the Crucible which lasted seventy-four minutes fifty-eight seconds between Stephen Maguire and Mark King.

The 2010 Championship was won by Neil Robertson who beat qualifier Graeme Dott 18–13 in the final, becoming the fourth non-U.K. winner of the title after Horace Lindrum, Cliff Thorburn and Ken Doherty.

John Higgins won his fourth world title in 2011, beating Judd Trump 18–15 in the final. 21-year-old Trump became the youngest finalist since Stephen Hendry in 1990. Trump had beaten David Gilbert in the qualifying competition and then defeated defending champion Neil Robertson in the first round.

Ronnie O'Sullivan won his fourth world title in 2012, defeating Ali Carter 18–11 in the final. On the opening day Hendry made his third maximum break at the Crucible, equalling Ronnie O'Sullivan's record. He announced his retirement from professional snooker following his loss to Stephen Maguire in the quarter-finals. Aged , Luca Brecel became the youngest player to compete at the Crucible.

Defending champion Ronnie O'Sullivan retained the title in 2013 despite having played only one competitive match all season. He defeated Barry Hawkins 18–12 in the final to win the title for the fifth time. He broke Hendry's record of 127 career Crucible centuries, finishing the tournament with 131. He also became the first player to make six century breaks in a Crucible final.

Between 1998 and 2020, seventeen of the twenty-three finals featured at least one class of '92 player.

Selby and the veterans (2014–2022)

Mark Selby won the world title in 2014 by beating defending champion Ronnie O'Sullivan 18–14 in the final having trailed 5–10. Selby won a record £300,000 for his victory; the prize exceeding the previous highest of £270,000 in 2003, although prize money for first-round losers remained at £12,000.

Selby lost 9–13 in the second round of the 2015 Championship to Crucible debutant Anthony McGill. Stuart Bingham won the title, defeating Ronnie O'Sullivan 13–9 in the quarter-finals, Judd Trump 17–16 in the semi-finals, and Shaun Murphy 18–15 in the final to win the first world title of his twenty-year professional career. At the age of 38, Bingham became the oldest player to win the title since Ray Reardon in 1978 (although this achievement would subsequently be surpassed by 43-year-old Mark Williams in 2018, 44-year-old O'Sullivan in 2020, and 46-year-old O'Sullivan in 2022). The tournament set a new record for the most century breaks made at the Crucible, with eighty-six.

Defending champion Stuart Bingham lost 9–10 against Ali Carter in the first round of the 2016 Championship. Mark Selby defeated Ding Junhui 18–14 in the final to claim his second world title. Ding was the first Asian player to reach a World Championship final. There were eighty-six century breaks made during the Championship, equalling the record set in 2015. A new record of ten centuries in a professional match was set in the semi-final between Ding Junhui and Alan McManus, with Ding also setting a new record of seven centuries by one player in a World Championship match. Mark Selby and Marco Fu set a new record for the longest frame of snooker ever played at the Crucible, seventy minutes eleven seconds.

Prize money for the 2017 Championship was a record £1,750,000 with the winner receiving £375,000. Prize money for first-round losers was a record £16,000, exceeding the £15,000 players received in 2003. In a high-quality and tightly contested semi-final, defending champion Mark Selby beat Ding Junhui 17–15 in a repeat of the previous year's final. Selby met John Higgins, in a repeat of the 2007 final. Selby trailed 4–10 during the second session but then won twelve of the next fourteen
frames to lead 16–12. Higgins won the next three frames but Selby took the title 18–15, becoming champion for the third time in four years, joining Steve Davis, Stephen Hendry, and Ronnie O'Sullivan as the only men to have successfully defended the title since its move to the Crucible.

In 2018, two "class of '92" players, Mark Williams and John Higgins, met in the final. Their rivalry dated back to the late 1990s, although only three of their meetings had been in the World Championships, all in semifinals, in 1999, 2000 (both won by Williams 17–15) and 2011 (won by Higgins 17–14). The match was closely contested, Williams coming out on top by 18–16 to win the World Championship for the first time since 2003, setting a new record for the longest gap between World Championship victories. He won £425,000.

Higgins reached the final again in 2019, only to be beaten 18–9 by Judd Trump, who won £500,000. Their final set records for the most century breaks in a professional match, with 11, beating the previous record of 10 set in the 2016 semifinal between Ding Junhui and Alan McManus. It also set a record for the most centuries in a Crucible final, bettering the previous record of eight, set in 2002 when Stephen Hendry played Peter Ebdon, and equalled in 2013 when O'Sullivan played Barry Hawkins. Trump set a new record for the most centuries by a player in a single match, achieving seven to better O'Sullivan's six centuries in the 2013 final. The tournament also recorded a record 100 century breaks.

The 2020 championship was postponed as a result of the COVID-19 pandemic, finishing on 16 August instead of the originally planned date of 4 May. Ronnie O'Sullivan made a record 28th consecutive appearance at the Crucible and won the championship for the sixth time, beating Kyren Wilson 18–8 in the final, and collecting prize money of £500,000. It was O'Sullivan's 37th ranking title, passing the record of 36 ranking titles won by Stephen Hendry. John Higgins made the first 147 break at the Crucible since 2012, earning him the £15,000 highest break prize plus an additional £40,000 bonus for achieving a maximum.

At the 2021 event, O'Sullivan was knocked out in the second round by Anthony McGill in a final-frame decider. Judd Trump and Neil Robertson both fell in the quarter-finals. Selby met Murphy in the final, and won 18–15.

At the 2022 event, O'Sullivan equalled Steve Davis's record of 30 Crucible appearances. The Class of '92 — O'Sullivan, Higgins, and Williams — all reached the semi-finals for the first time since 1999. O'Sullivan defeated Trump 18–13 in the final to win his seventh world title, equalling Hendry's modern-era record. Aged 46 years and 148 days, he became the oldest world champion in the tournament's history, surpassing Reardon, who was aged 45 years and 203 days when he won his last title in 1978. O'Sullivan also surpassed Hendry's record of 70 Crucible wins, setting a new record of 74. The second-round match between Selby and Yan Bingtao featured the longest frame ever played at the Crucible, at 85 minutes. Dott made a maximum break in the qualifying rounds, and Robertson made a maximum in his second-round match against Lisowski, becoming the eighth player to make a 147 at the Crucible. A new record of 109 century breaks was set at the Crucible stage, one more than the 108 made the previous year. Williams made 16 centuries during the event, equalling the record for the most centuries in a single championship set by Hendry in 2002.

Format 
 The format of the televised stages of the World Championship has remained unchanged since 1982, with the exception of a change in the semi-final format that was introduced in 1997. It has a knock-out format with 32 players, contested over 17 days ending on the first Monday in May, which is May Day bank holiday in the United Kingdom. Of the 32 players, 16 reach the final stages automatically while the other 16 need to earn a place through a qualifying competition. The reigning world champion receives a direct entry and is the number one seed (the World Champion is usually seeded at least 2nd for all ranking tournaments, and The Masters, for the following season). The remaining direct entries are based on the latest world rankings, players being seeded based on these world rankings. Since the defending champion is normally ranked in the top 16, the top 16 ranked players generally receive a direct entry.

Before 1982, there were a number of different formats used for the championship. In 1980 and 1981, 24 players competed in the final stages at the Crucible; the top eight seeds had a bye in the first round while seeds 9 to 16 played in the first round against eight qualifiers. From 1977 to 1979, the first three years at the Crucible, only 16 players reached the final stages, eight seeds playing eight qualifiers in the first round.

The current length format of matches per round is as follows. The first round is played over best of 19 frames, played over two sessions. The second round and quarter-finals are the best of 25 frames played over three sessions; while the semi-finals and final are played over four sessions, the semi-finals being best of 33 frames and the final being best of 35 frames. For the first 12 days of the tournament, until the end of the quarter-final stage, two matches are played concurrently. For the last five days (the semi-finals and final) only one table is used.

From 1980–1996, the semi-finals were played over best of 31 frames, before this was changed from 1997 onwards to best of 33 frames. The Championship has nearly always ended on the first Monday in May since the Championship first became a 17-day event in 1982, but there have been five exceptions. In 1982, the Championship ended on Sunday 16 May; while in 1985, 1990 and 1995, the Championship ended on the last Sunday in April. In all four of those years, the tournament started on a Friday rather than a Saturday. The fifth and most recent instance of the tournament starting on a Friday was the 2020 edition: due to the COVID-19 pandemic, the Championship was played from Friday 31 July to Sunday 16 August.

Several changes to the qualifying system came into effect for the 2015 championship. All living world champions would be extended an opportunity to play in the qualifying rounds. The top 16 seeds would still qualify automatically for the first round at the Crucible, but all non-seeded players would have to start in the first of three qualifying rounds. Previously players seeded 17 to 32 only had to win one qualifying match to reach the final stages. The overall championship would increase from 128 to 144 players, with the additional places made available to former world champions and players from emerging countries.

In 2020, another significant change was made to the qualifying competition for the World Championship. Whereas in previous years, the qualifying rounds were played like a mini-tournament (with all seeded players playing an unseeded player in the very first round), with the 16 "winners" being the qualifiers to go to the main draw using traditional knockout format, the new system involved seeding the players based on their world ranking. Players seeded 1-32 (representing 17–54 in the world rankings) would join the qualifying later than those who were seeded lower, or unseeded. The lowest-ranked and those who were invited as amateurs played in Round 1, with the winner moving on to play in Round 2 against a seeded player from 55 to 91 in the world rankings. In addition to the format change, the 2020 qualifying round became the first qualifying tournament to be broadcast on television in the history of snooker. Previously, only the Judgement Day round was broadcast on World Snookers' social media platforms.

Since the 2020 tournament was held during the height of the global COVID-19 pandemic, Rounds 1–3 were played as a single session best-of-11 frames match, with only the "Judgement Day" final round played with the usual best-of-19 system. This change to the length of matches persisted into the 2021 and 2022 championships for the same reasons. From 2023, the match length of the qualifying rounds reverted to the previous incarnation of best-of-19’s, but the seeded format remains in place.

Winners

World Championship finalists
From its foundation in 1927, the world snooker championship was dominated by Joe Davis, who won each of the first 15 tournaments before retiring undefeated in 1946. In 1952, a dispute between the BACC and the PBPA led to the formation of the World Professional Match-play Championship, whose winners are generally acknowledged as world champions. No championship was held between 1957 and 1964, when it was revived on a challenge basis until 1968.

The 'modern' era is considered to have started in 1969, when the championship reverted to a knock-out tournament format from a challenge format. Since then, the best record is seven wins, by Stephen Hendry (1990–1999) and Ronnie O'Sullivan (2001–2022). Ray Reardon won six times in the 1970s, while Steve Davis won six times in the 1980s.

 Active players are shown in bold.
 Only players who reached the final are included.
 Appearances relates to appearances in the final stages, excluding qualifying match.
 In the event of identical records, players are sorted in alphabetical order by family name.

Sponsorship

Except for two championships played in Australia, all championships from 1969 to 2005 were sponsored by tobacco companies. In 1969 and 1970 the championship was sponsored by John Player under the brand Player's No.6. The Gallaher Group sponsored under the brand Park Drive from 1972 to 1974, while from 1976 to 2005 Imperial Tobacco sponsored under the brand Embassy. Legislation in 2003 placed restrictions on tobacco advertising, including sponsorship of sporting events. Embassy received special dispensation to continue snooker sponsorship until 2005.

From 2006 to 2022, all championships were sponsored by betting companies. In 2006, 888.com took over sponsorship of the event under a five-year deal, but it pulled out after just three years. Betfred.com was the sponsor from 2009 to 2012, followed by Betfair in 2013, Dafabet in 2014, and Betfred again from 2015 to 2022.

Online car retailer Cazoo have signed a multi-year deal to sponsor the tournament from 2023.

Television coverage
Before the world championship moved to the Crucible in 1977, TV coverage was very limited. In the 1950s, the BBC occasionally showed snooker on black and white television, including 30-minute programmes of the 1953 and 1955 finals, with commentary by Sidney Smith. Despite the launch of Pot Black in colour in 1969, there was little coverage of the World Championship. There was some coverage of the 1973, 1974 and 1976 world championships in Manchester on two Saturday afternoon Grandstand programmes during those three years. Commentary was by Ted Lowe.

BBC TV coverage for the first Crucible championship in 1977 was increased but was limited to highlights of the semi-finals and some coverage of the final on Grandstand and a late night highlights programme. The commentator was Ted Lowe with the highlight programmes presented by Alan Weeks. The 1978 championship was the first to have daily BBC TV coverage with 14 nightly highlights programmes as well as Saturday afternoon coverage on Grandstand. Ted Lowe commentated while the programmes were presented by David Vine and Alan Weeks. In 1979, TV coverage was extended to include an early-evening "Frame of the Day" as well as live coverage of parts of the final. David Vine was the presenter while the commentary team was extended to include Jack Karnehm and Clive Everton. In 1980, TV coverage included daily live coverage for the first time. Coverage of the final was interrupted to bring live coverage of the Iranian Embassy Siege.

David Vine continued to be the main host for the BBC's TV coverage until 2000, with David Icke as prominent second host from 1984 to 1990, and Dougie Donnelly through the 1990s. For some years commentary was primarily by Ted Lowe, Clive Everton and Jack Karnehm although John Pulman, Vera Selby and others were used. In 1986 Jim Meadowcroft, John Spencer and John Virgo were used as summarisers. From 2001 to 2009 the BBC coverage was hosted by Hazel Irvine or Ray Stubbs. From 2010, Hazel Irvine took over with highlights presented by Rishi Persad. In February 2013, the BBC announced that Rishi Persad had been replaced by Jason Mohammad, who himself later stepped down from those duties after the conclusion of the 2019 Masters and was replaced by Seema Jaswal. Commentators have included Willie Thorne, Dennis Taylor, John Virgo, John Parrott, Steve Davis, Ken Doherty, Stephen Hendry, Terry Griffiths and Neal Foulds.

In January 2013, it was announced that the BBC had renewed its contract to broadcast the Triple Crown tournaments up until the end of the 2016/2017 season, which has since been extended continually. The BBC now has the rights to the tournament until 2027, which coincides with the 50th anniversary of the tournament being played at the Crucible Theatre and the 100th anniversary of the official inauguration of the tournament in 1927.

Since 2003, Eurosport has provided coverage of the snooker season, with commentators including Philip Studd, David Hendon, Joe Johnson and Neal Foulds. For the World Championship, additional commentary from Phil Yates and Dominic Dale is provided. Alan McManus previously provided commentary for Eurosport before moving to the BBC, but now provides punditry services only to Eurosports' coverage of the event. In the past, Eurosport provided televised coverage of both tables via Eurosport 1 and Eurosport 2 but has since cut back by only showing the "main" match of the session on Eurosport 1, with the other table available via the Discovery+ and Eurosport Player streaming services. Eurosport currently has the right to show the tournament until 2026.

See also

 Crucible curse – A "curse" for all first-time winners of the event, since it moved to the Crucible Theatre

References

External links

 
Recurring sporting events established in 1927
1927 establishments in England
World championships in snooker
Snooker ranking tournaments
Snooker competitions in England
Sports competitions in Sheffield
International sports competitions hosted by England